Michael Leroy Griffin (born June 26, 1957) is a retired Major League Baseball pitcher. He played during six seasons at the major league level for the New York Yankees, Chicago Cubs, San Diego Padres, Baltimore Orioles, and Cincinnati Reds. He was drafted by the Texas Rangers in the 3rd round of the 1976 amateur draft. Griffin played his last season with the Reds and their Triple-A affiliate, the Nashville Sounds in 1989. As of 2019, he is the pitching coach for the Norfolk Tides.

External links

1957 births
Living people
Major League Baseball pitchers
New York Yankees players
Chicago Cubs players
San Diego Padres players
Baltimore Orioles players
Cincinnati Reds players
Asheville Tourists players
Tulsa Drillers players
West Haven Yankees players
Columbus Clippers players
Wichita Aeros players
Oklahoma City 89ers players
Omaha Royals players
Rochester Red Wings players
Nashville Sounds players
Baseball players from California
Minor league baseball coaches
People from Colusa, California